The Meyer Brothers Drug Company was a major wholesale drug house founded by Christian F. G. Meyer at Fort Wayne, Indiana in 1852. Meyer had come to the United States from Hanover, Germany in 1847, and, after a few years, started a drug business. By 1865, the business had grown that it branched out to other cities. Meyer picked St. Louis, knowing that the city was destined to be one of the greatest distributing markets in America. In 1865 he purchased the M. Matthews and Sons drug firm, located on the corner of Second and Locust Streets (now part of the Gateway Arch grounds). The success of the branch store eventually caused the firm to move its headquarters to St. Louis. By the early part of the 20th century, Meyer Brothers was the largest distributor of drugs and pharmaceutical products in the country and also a major exporter of these commodities to other countries in the Western Hemisphere. It was bought out by Fox Meyer Health Corporation in July 1981.

References

1852 establishments in Indiana
Pharmaceutical companies established in 1852
Pharmaceutical companies of the United States
Health care companies based in Missouri